Yi Yuksa Literary Museum is a memorial hall built in Andong in 2004 to honor Yi Yuksa's life and literature. Yi Yuksa was anti-Japanese poet of the Japanese occupation. Yi Yuksa Literary Museum exhibits his historical data and achievements of the poet. It consists of an exhibition hall and a birthplace.

References

External links
  

Literary museums in South Korea
Andong